This a list of articles about religion in both the Republic of Ireland and Northern Ireland.
 Religion in the Republic of Ireland
 Religion in Northern Ireland
 Christianity in Ireland
 History of Christianity in Ireland
 Roman Catholicism in Ireland
 Protestantism in Ireland
 Reformation in Ireland
 Islam in Ireland
 Islam in Northern Ireland
 Hinduism in Ireland
 Hinduism in the Republic of Ireland
 Hinduism in Northern Ireland
 History of the Jews in Ireland
 History of the Jews in Northern Ireland
Neo-paganism in the Republic of Ireland
 See Neopaganism in the United Kingdom for Neopaganism in Northern Ireland.